Daniel Théodore Schlumberger (19 December 1904 – 21 October 1972) was a French archaeologist and Professor of Near Eastern Archaeology at the University of Strasbourg and later Princeton University.

Biography
After having been invited by Khan Nasher in the 1960s, he conducted fieldwork at Ay Khanum in Afghanistan as Director of the Délégation Archéologique Française, discovering ruins and artifacts of the Hellenistic period. His written works were included posthumously in The Cambridge History of Iran (1983).

He was an older brother of Jean Schlumberger.

References 

Academic staff of the University of Strasbourg
Princeton University faculty
French archaeologists
Members of the Académie des Inscriptions et Belles-Lettres
1972 deaths
1904 births
People from Mulhouse
20th-century archaeologists
Corresponding Fellows of the British Academy